On 26 November 2021, a bus crashed on the Joquicingo-Malinalco highway in Central Mexico, killing at least 19 people. A bus carrying Catholic pilgrims was travelling on a highway on route to a religious shrine when it crashed into a house.

Events 
The bus was reportedly carrying Roman Catholic pilgrims, traveling from Michoacán to the Chalma temple, a religious site in Chalma. The site is popular among Christians who pilgrimage there for 12 December, the day of the Virgin of Guadalupe. The crash happened in the small town of San José el Guarda near the municipality of Joquicingo. Six people who were severely injured were flown to a hospital in Toluca. Witnesses said that the brakes of the bus failed, and the bus left the road crashing into a house.

Response 
Assistant state interior secretary Ricardo de la Cruz Musalem said that the injured had been airlifted to local hospitals and an investigation is underway.

President of Mexico Andrés Manuel López Obrador interrupted a speech to confirm the tragedy. Governor of the State of Mexico Alfredo del Mazo Maza said that he regretted the accident. He spoke of helping those injured and providing care to the families of the deceased.

See also 
 List of road accidents
 Mexico toll booth interstate disaster

References

External links 
 Report from The Star

2021 road incidents
2021 in Mexico
2021 disasters in Mexico
2020s in Mexico City
2020s road incidents in North America
Bus incidents in Mexico
Disasters in Mexico City
November 2021 events in Mexico